Estaing may refer to:

 Estaing, Aveyron, France
 Estaing, Hautes-Pyrénées, France

See also
 d'Estaing (disambiguation)